Chanoir, a.k.a. Alberto Vejarano, is a contemporary French-Colombian street artist born in 1976 in Bogota.

His nickname is a reference to a poster of the famous Parisian cabaret Le Chat Noir, by Théophile Steinlen.

Biography
Chanoir became vactive in the streets of Barcelona at the beginning of Y2K, where he did the documentary Murs Libres. In 2002, he became the founder of Collectif 1980 with other artists such as Jean-Philippe Illanes, Alexandre Sirvin, Hugo Garcia, et Ernest Añaños Montoto.

His father, Gustavo Vejerano, is a painter.

Style and influences
His colored figures take their roots in the ligne claire and cartoon style. Chanoir gets his inspiration from his childhood in the 80s: the simple lines of Barbapapa, the craziness of Les Shadoks and naïve mangas for kids such as Hello Kitty.

Artists like Jean-Michel Basquiat or Keith Haring are obvious references too.

Expositions

Collaboration with brands
Amongst his most notable commercial work are: 
 the design of a collection for Cacharel at the Galeries Lafayette
 phone cases for Samsung 
 a mural fresque for Disney store on the Champs-Élysées.
 decors for the video game Just Dance 19 
 the perfumes Fresh Her and Fresh Him by Ungaro

Other works 
Murs libres, a documentary about the street art crew of Barcelona with Jean-Michel Alberola

Further reading
Street Art: The Spray Files
Street Logos, Tristan Manco, Thames & Hudson, 2004,

Notes

French contemporary artists
1976 births
Artists from Paris
Living people
French male painters
Street artists
French people of Colombian descent